American actress Julianna Margulies has been widely recognized for her portrayal of Carol Hathaway in ER and Alicia Florrick in The Good Wife, winning eight Screen Actors Guild Awards, three Primetime Emmy Awards, one Critics' Choice Television Award, one Golden Globe Award, and one TCA Award.

Critics' Choice Television Awards

Dorian Awards

Golden Globes Awards

Monte-Carlo Television Festival

Online Film & Television Association Awards

People's Choice Awards

Primetime Emmy Awards

Satellite Awards

Screen Actors Guild Awards

Television Critics Association Awards

Viewers for Quality Television Awards

References

External links 
 Julianna Margulies at Emmys.com
 

Margulies, Julianna